The Asian Institute of Computer Studies (AICS) is a private and non-sectarian educational institution in the Philippines founded in 1996. Its academic offerings mainly focus on computer science, information and communications technology and business studies.

History
Manuel T. Asis, an architect by profession, founded the school in 1996 with an enrollment of 50 students. The first AICS campus opened in Fairview, Quezon City. It grew to 600 students by its second year of operations. In succeeding years, it expanded and established new campuses within the Metro Manila area.

The school has 17 campuses all over Luzon and a campus in Cebu City. The AICS campus at Commonwealth Avenue inj Quezon City is the flagship campus and administrative hub for school operations. AICS is currently headed by Anthony S. Asis.

Academics
Academic degrees
Its offered courses include 4-year Bachelor of Science degrees in computer science, computer engineering and entrepreneurship. It also offers short courses on networking, computer programming, multimedia and office applications. In the 2016-7 school year, it accepted its first batch of students in the senior high school department.

The school's curricular offerings are approved and accredited by the Philippine Department of Education, Technical Education and Skills Development Authority and the Commission on Higher Education.

Academic calendar
AICS follows a traditional two-semester academic calendar. The first semester starts around early or mid-June and ends in late October, with a break of two weeks. The second semester starts in the second week of November, with a two-week Christmas break in late December, and resumes by the first week of January and ends in late March. In 2020, AICS moved the start of its classes from June to August.

Campuses
AICS has 17 campuses within Luzon and one in Cebu:
Bacoor
Batangas City
Bicutan
Calamba
Caloocan
Commonwealth (flagship campus and administrative seat)
Dau
GMA
Lipa
Marilao
Montalban
Olongapo
San Fernando
Santa Rosa
Tanay
Tarlac
Taytay
Cebu

See also

Higher education in the Philippines
Education in the Philippines
AMA Computer University
Asia Pacific College
iAcademy
Informatics Philippines
STI College

References

External links
 

Universities and colleges in Metro Manila
Educational institutions established in 1996
Information technology institutes
Information technology schools
1996 establishments in the Philippines